Alvin O'Neal McBean (born May 15, 1938) is a former professional baseball player from the United States Virgin Islands. He played in Major League Baseball as a pitcher, most notably for the Pittsburgh Pirates with whom he played the majority of his career.

St. Thomas tryouts
McBean grew up playing baseball in his native Virgin Islands. Originally only there to take pictures for a local paper, McBean was convinced by friends to try out, and ended up receiving an invite to Spring training .

Breaking in with the Pirates
After three seasons in the Pirates' farm system, in which he went 28-21 with a 3.57 earned run average, McBean made his major league debut on July 2,  in the first game of a doubleheader against the San Francisco Giants at Forbes Field. Entered a tied game, the first batter he faced, Ed Bailey, reached on an error by second baseman Bill Mazeroski. A double, wild pitch & single later, the Giants had plated two runs. A four run eighth inning by the Pirates spared McBean from taking the loss in his major league debut.

In his next 6 appearances, McBean pitched 10.2 innings without surrendering a run, and earning the first two wins of his career. His first career start also came against the Giants on September 11. He allowed three earned runs over nine innings, and left with the game tied for the no-decision. For the season, he went 3-2 with a 3.75 ERA & 49 strikeouts.

He finished with a 15-10 record & 3.70 ERA over the full season.

Latino All-Star
He was 2-1 with a 3.46 ERA when he was converted into a reliever in May . He was dominant in that role, going 11-2 with a 2.12 ERA and earning eleven saves out of the bullpen. After the season, he joined Roberto Clemente's National League Latino All-stars for a game at the Polo Grounds on October 12. McBean followed Juan Marichal's four scoreless innings pitched with four scoreless of his own, and drove in a run with a sixth inning triple to lead the NL to a 5-2 victory.

Sporting News Fireman of the Year
Following a June 27 victory over the Cincinnati Reds, McBean was 3-0 with an 0.69 ERA & eight saves. He earned 21 saves over the season, which was good enough for second place in the NL (to the Houston Colt .45s' Hal Woodeshick). Coupled with his 8-3 record, he was named The Sporting News' NL Fireman of the Year.

Meanwhile, manager Harry Walker relegated McBean to mop up duty. He appeared in 32 of the Pirates' 70 losses; the Pirates were 15-32 in games he appeared.

Return to starting
Walker was fired midway through the  season, and replaced by his predecessor, Danny Murtaugh. At the time, McBean was 2-1 with a 3.04 ERA & four saves. After sixteen appearances out of the bullpen for Murtaugh, McBean was returned to the starting rotation. He went 4-1 with a 2.11 ERA & five complete games in seven starts for the manager he broke into the big leagues with.

1968 Major League Baseball expansion draft
McBean was the 50th player selected in the 1968 Major League Baseball expansion draft by the San Diego Padres. He made just one appearance with the Padres before being dealt to the Los Angeles Dodgers for shortstop Tommy Dean & pitcher Leon Everitt. Again a reliever, McBean went 2-6 with a 3.91 ERA & four saves out of the Dodgers' bullpen. He would make seven appearances, all in relief, before his May 18 release. He would pitch in the Philadelphia Phillies' system into the  season before retiring.

Career statistics

McBean was a decent hitting pitcher. He had three career home runs, one of which came in his second career at bat. He also hit a grand slam off the St. Louis Cardinals' Larry Jaster.

Personal life
On August 27, 1962, McBean married Olga Santos Negron of Playa de Ponce, whom he had met the previous winter, while pitching in the Puerto Rican Winter League. His Pirates roommate Roberto Clemente served as best man while the bride was given away by 42-year-old rookie reliever Diomedes Olivo. Upon retirement, McBean returned to the Virgin Islands, and joined the St. Thomas Housing, Parks & Recreation Department. Moving up to deputy commissioner, he chartered the Little League program & beautification projects. He also has a landscaping business. He also opened the Alvin McBean Recreation Complex on St. Thomas.

References

External links

1938 births
Living people
Major League Baseball pitchers
Pittsburgh Pirates players
San Diego Padres players
Los Angeles Dodgers players
Major League Baseball players from the United States Virgin Islands
Clinton Pirates players
Salem Rebels players
Wilson Tobs players
Savannah Pirates players
Columbus Jets players
Eugene Emeralds players
People from Saint Thomas, U.S. Virgin Islands